The following is a list of historical and contemporary Assyrian settlements in the Middle East. This list includes settlements of Assyrians from Southeastern Turkey who left their indigenous tribal districts in Hakkari (or the historical Hakkari region), Sirnak and Mardin province due to torment, violence and displacement by Ottomans and Kurds in the First World War. Many Assyrians from Urmia, Iran were also affected and as such have emigrated and settled in other towns. Resettling again occurred during the Simele massacre in northern Iraq, perpetrated by the Iraqi military coup in the 1930s, with many fleeing to northeastern Syria.

Most modern resettlement is located in Iraq, Syria and Iran in the cities of Baghdad, Habbaniyah, Kirkuk, Duhok, Al-Hasakah, Tehran and Damascus. Few Assyrian settlements exist in Turkey today and also in the Caucasus. The exodus to the cities or towns of these aforementioned countries occurred between late 1910s and 1930s. After the Iraq War in 2003, a number of Assyrians in Baghdad relocated to the Assyrian homeland in northern Iraq. Many others have immigrated to North America, Europe and Australia, especially in the late 20th century and 21st century. Currently, there are a number of settlements on this list that have been abandoned due to persecution, conflict, and other causes.

Iraq

Baghdad Province

Dohuk Province

Erbil Province

Kirkuk Governorate

Nineveh Province

Abandoned villages

Iran

West Azerbaijan Province
 Akhtekhaneh
 Anhar
 Armod Agaj
 Ada
 Ardishai
 Balanej (Balanush)
 Balowlan
 Chamakieh
 Charbash
 Digala
 Dizataka
 Gavilan
 Geogtapa populated
 Golpashan populated
 Iryawa
 Khanishan
 Khosrava
 Lolham (Lulpa)
 Mar Nukha
 Mar Sargis
 Margawar
 Mawana ܡܥܘܢܐ
 Mushawa
 Qarajalu
 Saatlou
 Salmas
 Sangar
 Jamlava (Jamal Abad)
 Sarna
 Shirabad
 Sir
 Sawraa
 Yengija
 Zoomalan ܙܘܡܠܢ

Urmia County
Margawar
Razhani
Nergi
Gerdiki
Diza
Gullistan
Salamas
Chara
Zewajik
Ulah
Guliser
Khanaga
Patamur
Sawra
Delemon
Mahlam
Sarna
Tergawar
Anbi
Balulan
Darband
Dastalan
Haki
Qurana
Mar Behisho (Iran-Turkey border)
Mavana
Salona
Shibani
Tuleki
Tulu
Sumay-ye Beradust District
Urmia
Mawana
Mushabad
Charbash
Borashan
Anhar
Gulpashan
Gug Tappeh
Darbarut
Mar Sargis
Seiri
Shirabad
Kirakiz
Chamaki
Kuchiye
Nazi
Kosi
Gangachin
Sopurghan

Iranian Kurdistan
 Sanandaj

Tehran Province
 Gisha

Syria

Assyrians immigrated to Syria during the 1930s and 1940s, from northern Iraq, after they were slaughtered and displaced during the Simele massacre perpetrated by the armed forces of the Kingdom of Iraq. Many Assyrians in Syria did not have Syrian citizenship and title to their land until late 1940s. The Assyrians who settled in the Khabour River Valley organized their villages according to their own tribal structure, with each village belonging to a single tribe. As such, each village effectively has two names, the official Arabic name and the unofficial Assyrian name, with the latter being the name of the tribe that built the town.

Al-Hasakah Governorate
Villages in the Khabour River Valley
 Abu Tinah (Jilu)
 al-Kharitah (Tkhuma)
 Qaber Shamiyah (Diz)
 Tell Ahmar (Upper Tyari)
 Tell Arboush (Tkhuma)
 Tell Balouaah (Diz)
 Tell Baz (Baz)
 Tell Bureij (Tkhuma)
 Tell Damshij (Qodchanis)
 Tell Fuweidat (Nochiya)
 Tell Goran (Jilu)
 Tell Hefyan (Qodchanis)
 Tell Hermez (Tkhuma)
 Tell Jedaya (Gawar)
 Tell Jazira (Eiel)
 Tell Jemaah (Halmoun)
 Tell Kifji (Liwan)
 Tell Makhadah (Tkhuma)
 Tell Maghas (Gawar)
 Tell Massas (Barwar)
 Tell Najma (Sara)
 Tell Nasri (Upper Tyari)
 Tell Ruman Foqani (Baz)
 Tell Ruman Tahtani (Tkhuma)
 Tell Sakra (Tkhuma)
 Tell Shamah (Tkhuma)
 Tell Shamiram (Marbisho)
 Tell Tal (Tkhuma)
 Tell Talaah (Sara)
 Tell Tamer (Upper Tyari)
 Tell Tawil (Upper Tyari)
 Tell Wardiat (Tkhuma)
 Umm al-Keif (Timar)
 Umm Ghargan (Tkhuma)
 Umm Waghfa (Upper Tyari)

Cities and towns with Syriac-Assyrian population
 Al-Darbasiyah
 Al-Hasakah
 Al-Malikiyah
 Al-Qahtaniyah
 Amuda
 Qamishli
 Ras al-Ayn

Villages
 Berabeytê/Berebeyt (ܒܰܪ ܒܝܬܐܰ ,بره بيت)
 Ghardugah
 Khanik
 Kirku Shamu
 Mahriqan
 Qir Sharan
 Safiyah
 Tal Aluw
 Tall Jana
 Tell Halaf
 Tirbekay

Damascus Governorate
Note: Maaloula and neighboring Muslim-majority villages Jubb'adin and Al-Sarkha are the only villages left where a majority of the population speak the Western Aramaic dialects
 Damascus
 Saidnaya
 Maaloula
 Al-Sarkha
 Jubb'adin

Homs Governorate
 Fairouzeh
 Zaidal
 Maskanah
 Al-Qaryatayn
 Sadad

Turkey

Diyarbakır Province
 Diyarbakır

Batman Province
 Hesno d'Kefo
 Kafro 'Elayto

Mardin province
 ʼArbo
 ʼAnḥel
 Beth Kustan
 Beth Debe, Turkish: Dibek
 Beth Man’am, Turkish: Bahminir
 Birguriya, Turkish: Birigirya
 Bnebil, Turkish: Benabil
 Boté, Turkish: Bardakçı
 Chtrako
 Dara, Turkish: Oğuz
 Derelya
 Dayro Daslibo
 Deyrqube
 Ehwo, Turkish: Güzelsu
 Eskikale
 Habsus, Turkish: Mercimekli
 Hah, Turkish: Anıtlı
 Harabale/Arkah, Turkish: Üçköy
 Harabémechka, Turkish: Dağiçi
 Kafro Tahtayto
 Iwardo
 Keferb
 Keferze
 Kelith, Turkish: Dereiçi
 Kerburan
 Kfarbé, Turkish: Güngören
 M’aré, Turkish: Eskihisar
 Ma'asarte, Turkish: Ömerli
 Mardin
 Midyat
 Mor Bobo, Turkish: Günyurdu
 Mzizah
 Nusaybin
 Qritho di‘Ito (Gundeké Sukru)
 Qritho Hanna (Gundeké Hanna)
 Saleh, Turkish: Barıştepe
 Séderi, Turkish: Üçyol
 Zaz

Şırnak Province
 Azakh, Turkish: İdil
 Hoz, in Beytüşşebap
 Meer, Turkish: Kovankaya
 Öğündük
 Sare/Ester/Gawayto, Turkish: Sarıköy

Hakkari Province
The following is a list of Assyrian settlements in the Hakkari region prior to the Assyrian genocide of 1914. The Assyrian settlements in this region were divided into two groups, ashiret and rayyat. The ashiret settlements belonged to the five semi-independent tribes of Tyari, Tkhuma, Baz, Jilu, and Dez with each tribe presiding over its own district. The rayyat settlements were vassals to either the ashiret tribes or to Kurdish chieftains.

Villages in the Lower Tyari District (Ashiret)
 Arosh
 Ashita
 Bet Alata
 Bet Ragula
 Bet Zizo
 Challuk
 Chamba d'Bet Susina
 Chire Rezan
 Geramon
 Halmun
 Hur
 Kurhe
 Karukta
 Lagippa
 Lizan
 Mata d'Qasra
 Minyanish
 Ragula d'Salabakkan
 Shurd
 Umra Tahktaya
 Zarni
 Zawita

Villages in the Upper Tyari and Walto Districts (Ashiret and Rayyat)
 Aina d'Alile
 Bet Dalyata
 Bet Mariggo
 Bet Nahra
 Bet Zraqo
 Chamba d'Bet Eliya
 Chamba d'Hasso
 Chamba Khadta
 Chamba d'Kurkhe
 Chamba d'Malik
 Chamba d'Nene
 Chamba d'Kurdaye
 Dadosh
 Darawa (Ishte d'Nahra)
 Dura Ellaya
 Jemiata
 Khadiana
 Ko
 Mabbuwa
 Ma'lota d'Malik
 Mata d'Mart Maryam
 Mazra'a
 Mazra'a d'Qelayata
 Mratita
 Qelayata
 Resha d'Nahra
 Roma Smoqa
 Rumta
 Saraspidon
 Serta
 Shwawuta
 Siyador
 Zorawa

Villages in the Tkhuma District (Ashiret)
 Bet Arijai
 Gissa
 Gundikta
 Khani
 Mazra'a
 Tkhuma Gawaya

Villages in the Baz District (Ashiret)
 Argeb
 Bet Salam
 Mata Takhtaita
 Orwantus
 Qojija
 Shwawuta

Villages in the Jilu District (Ashiret)
 Alsan
 Ammod
 Bet Boqra
 Bubawa
 Marmuria
 Mata d'Mar Zaya
 Mata d'Oryaye
 Matriya
 Medhi
 Muspiran
 Nahra
 Nirek
 Omut
 Ore
 Samsekke
 Sarpel
 Saten (half Assyrian, half Kurd)
 Talana
 Zir
 Zirine

Villages in the Dez, Shwawuta, and Billijnaye Districts (Ashiret and Rayyat)
 Alas
 Alogippa
 Aqose
 Awert
 Bet Respi (a)
 Bet Respi (b)
 Bet Shammasha
 Chiri Chara
 Chulchen
 Daden
 Dairikki
 Derres
 Golozor
 Kursen
 Mades
 Makita
 Mar Quriaqos
 Nauberi
 Rabban Dadisho
 Saqerran
 Saramos
 Shwawuta
 Suwwa

Villages in the Liwan and Norduz Districts (Rayyat)
 Bailekan
 Billi
 Daira d'Zengel
 Erke
 Gokhikki
 Khandaqe
 Khargel
 Kanunta
 Marwanan
 Mata d'Umra
 Nogwizan
 Parhilan
 Sekunis
 Tel Jeri
 Ulaman
 Zaranis

Villages in the Qodchanis & Siwine Districts (Rayyat)
 Akhwanis
 Bet Hajij
 Bet Nano
 Charos
 Espen
 Karme
 Khardalanis
 Kigar
 Nerwa
 Oret
 Pekhen
 Qodchanis
 Qotranis
 Quranis
 Sallan
 Shmuninis
 Siwine
 Sorlines
 Tarmel
 Tirqonis

Villages in the Chal, Raikan, & Tal Districts (Rayyat)
 Arewun
 Bet Alata
 Bet Aziza
 Bet Biyya
 Bet Daire
 Bet Iqta
 Bet Quraye
 Bet Shuqa
 Erbesh
 Erk
 Estep
 Gebba
 Hish
 Merkanish
 Qo
 Rebbat
 Shawreza
 Talana

Villages in the Gawar District (Rayyat)
 Bashirga
 Bet Rberre
 Dara
 Darawa
 Diza Gawar
 Gagoran
 Karpel
 Khulkhus
 Kiyyet
 Maken Awa
 Manunan
 Memekkan
 Page
 Pa'ilan
 Pirzalan
 Qadiyan
 Qardiwar
 Sardasht
 Sinawa
 Urisha
 Wazirawa
 Zirkanis
 Zizan

Villages in the Albaq, Derrenaye, Khananis, and Artushi Kurdish Districts (Rayyat)
 Alamiyyan
 Ates
 Ayyel
 Barwes
 Basan
 Bet Zeqte
 Burduk
 Erdshi
 Gezna
 Hoze
 Khalila
 Khananis Ellaita
 Khananis Takhtaita
 Kharaban
 Kharalun
 Mar Behisho
 Menjilawa
 Parrashin
 Pusan
 Ozan
 Qalanis
 Sharinis
 Silmuan

Villages in the Shemsdin District (Rayyat)
 Baituta
 Balqan
 Bet Babe
 Bet Daiwe
 Bet Garde
 Bet Tunyo
 Dara
 Daron
 Duri
 Duru
 Gargane
 Halana
 Harbunan
 Isira
 Kek Perzan
 Mar Denkha
 Marta
 Nairdusha
 Qatuna
 Rustaqa
 Sarunis
 Shaput
 Sursire
 Talana
 Tis

Villages in the Baradost, Tergawar, & Mergawar Districts (Rayyat)
 Anbi
 Balulan
 Biteme
 Darband
 Dizgari
 Gangajin
 Gundukmalaya
 Haki
 Halbi
 Hbashkube
 Heshmawa
 Hulutan
 Hurana
 Husar
 Irima
 Nargi
 Pasta
 Qaloga
 Qurana
 Razga
 Rusna
 Salona
 Shaikhani
 Sihani
 Susnawa
 Tuleki
 Tulu
 Urtira
 Uwasu
 Zangilan
 Ziruwa

Villages in the Taimar District (Rayyat)
 Aghjacha
 Armanis
 Gadalawa
 Hawsheshur
 Kharabsorik
 Kharashik
 Khinno
 Pokhanis
 Rushan
 Satibak
 Seel
 Serai
 Toan

Armenia 

The Assyrian population in Armenia is mainly rural. Out of 3,409 Assyrians in Armenia 2,885 (84.6%) was rural and 524 (15.4%) urban.
According to the Council of Europe European Charter for Regional or Minority Languages there were four rural settlements with significant Assyrian population.

Ararat Province
Verin Dvin - Assyrians and Armenians
Dimitrov - Assyrians and Armenians

Armavir Province
Nor Artagers - Assyrians, Armenians and Yazidis

Kotayk Province
Arzni - Assyrians and Armenians

See also
List of Assyrian tribes
Assyrian diaspora
Assyrian people
Arameans
List of Nochiyayeh settlements
Tur Abdin
Barwari
Hakkari
Nineveh Plains
Nahla Plains
Sapna valley

References

Bibliography

 

 
Iraq-related lists
Iran-related lists
Syria-related lists
Turkey-related lists